Pichai Sayotha (born December 24, 1979) is a Thai amateur boxer best known for winning a silver medal in the lightweight category at the 2003 World Championships.

Career
Sayotha made his national debut in 2002.

In 2003 he had his biggest success at the World Championships in his home country only losing to Mario Kindelán. 

In 2004 Summer Olympics he did not compete because he lost in the qualify of the national team representative to the senior boxer Somluck Kamsing in the lightweight category at The Mall Bangkhae.

He did not participate in 2005 and reached the quarterfinal in 2007 where he lost to Russian favorite Aleksei Tishchenko but qualified for Beijing (2008).

In 2005 he also competed for Thailand at the Boxing World Cup in Moscow, Russia, with one loss and one win in the preliminary round. In 2008 he beat Tishchenko at the Kings Cup. At the 2008 Summer Olympics he lost his only bout 4:10 to South Korean Baik Jong-Sub. After defeat, he retired.

References
World 2003
Kings Cup 2008
sports-reference

Living people
1979 births
Boxers at the 2008 Summer Olympics
Pichai Sayotha
Boxers at the 2002 Asian Games
Boxers at the 2006 Asian Games
Pichai Sayotha
AIBA World Boxing Championships medalists
Southeast Asian Games medalists in boxing
Pichai Sayotha
Competitors at the 2005 Southeast Asian Games
Pichai Sayotha
Lightweight boxers

Pichai Sayotha